Solandra maxima is a flowering plant in the Solanaceae family. It is also known as cup of gold vine, golden chalice vine, or Hawaiian lily, is a vigorous vine which is endemic to Mexico and Central America.  It has very large yellow flowers and glossy leaves. It is often planted as an ornamental plant.

Description
It is a fast-growing, 12 m (40 ft) tall climbing vine, which is often pruned back in cultivation to a shrub with overhanging twigs. All parts of the plant are poisonous. The leaves are alternately arranged, broad-elliptical to oblong, 5-18 × 2-9 cm in size, leathery, glossy on top and usually short-acuminate.

Flowers
The funnel-shaped flowers are usually solitary. The calyx is 5-8 cm long, pentagonal and consists of three to five cusps. The corolla is 15-24 cm long and consists of large, rounded, 8-15 cm wide lobes. The flower is creamy white to light yellow at the start of flowering and changes color to ocher to orange during flowering. Violet or brown bands run deep into the flower tube across the center of the corolla. Five stamens protrude from the flower tube. The flowers open in the evening, exuding a pungent scent. This attracts bats as pollinators. The fruits are round, up to 7 cm large berries on which the sepals are preserved.

Gallery

References

External links

Solanoideae
Vines
Flora of Mexico
Flora of Central America
Garden plants of Central America
Garden plants of North America
Taxa named by Martín Sessé y Lacasta
Taxa named by José Mariano Mociño
Taxa named by Michel Félix Dunal
Taxa named by Peter Shaw Green